This is a list of script typefaces.  This list details standard script fonts used in classical typesetting and printing.

Calligraphic

Handwriting

Additional script typefaces 

 Forte

See also 

 Fixedsys
 List of display typefaces
 List of monospaced typefaces
 List of sans serif typefaces
 List of serif typefaces

List
Script
Script